Events from the year 1513 in Scotland.

Incumbents
Monarch – James IV (until 9 September), then James V

Events
 9 September – Battle of Flodden in Northumberland: heavy defeat of the Scottish army by the English; King James IV and many nobles are killed in battle.
 Kilberry castle is destroyed by an English pirate.

Births
 unknown date – Archibald Douglas of Glenbervie, nobleman (died 1570)

Deaths
 9 September:
 James IV of Scotland, monarch, killed at Battle of Flodden (born 1473)
 George Douglas, Master of Angus, killed at Battle of Flodden (born 1469)
 William Sinclair, 2nd Earl of Caithness, killed at Battle of Flodden (born 1459)

See also

 Timeline of Scottish history

References

 
Years of the 16th century in Scotland